In mathematics, an isotropic manifold is a manifold in which the geometry does not depend on directions.

Examples
The simply-connected space forms (the n-sphere, hyperbolic space, and ) are isotropic. It is not true in general that any constant curvature manifold is isotropic; for example, the flat torus  is not isotropic. Moreover, it can be seen in a same way that no oriented surface with constant curvature and negative Euler characteristic is isotropic.

Moreover, there are isotropic manifolds which do not have constant curvature, such as the complex projective space  equipped with the Fubini-Study metric. But  is simply-connected yet not a sphere (for ), as can be seen for example from homotopy group calculations from long exact sequence of the fibration .

See also
 Cosmological principle
 Isotropic Manifold on Math.StackExchange (July 2013)

Differential geometry